Pelham Bay may refer to the following in the Bronx, New York City, within the U.S. state of New York:

 Pelham Bay, a body of water
 Pelham Bay (neighborhood), Bronx
 Pelham Bay Park, a park
 Pelham Bay Park (IRT Pelham Line), a subway station